Kotel Municipality is a municipality in the Sliven Province of Bulgaria.

Demography

At the 2011 census, the population of Kotel was 19,391. Most of the inhabitants were either Bulgarians (36.22%), Turks (29.87%), or Gypsies/Romani (24.7%). 8.14% of the population's ethnicity was unknown.

Villages
In addition to the capital town of Kotel, there are 21 villages in the municipality:

References

Municipalities in Sliven Province